The North of Ireland Championships  was an early Victorian period men's  and women's grass court tennis tournament founded in 1879. The championship was played at the Cliftonville Cricket Club, Belfast, County Antrim, Ireland. The tournament ran annually for fifteen editions until 1894. It was the precursor tournament to the later Ulster Grass Court Championships.

History
The regional tennis tournament the North of Ireland Championships tournament was established early as 1881, at the Cliftonville Cricket Club on Cliftonville Road in Belfast. Some time later the club was renamed as the Cliftonville Cricket and Lawn Tennis Club. The North of Ireland Championships tournament ran until 1894 when it was abandoned. cancelled after 1894.

Following World War One in 1919 new regional lawn tennis was established representative for Northern Ireland called the Ulster Grass Court Championships staged Belfast Boat Club, South Belfast. This grass court tournament ran until at least 1980. In 1928 a second regional tournament was established known as the Ulster Hard Court Championships that was played on clay courts that was staged through to the 1950s.

The former tournaments were both amateur events, but in the mid-1960s a professional event was staged in Belfast called the Ulster Professional Championships.

Notable male players who this championship includes Manliffe Goodbody who won it three times (1889, 1890, 1893).

References

Sources
 Baily's Magazine of Sports and Pastimes (1889). Volume LI. January - June. Vinton & Co Ltd, London.
 Routledges Sporting Annual (1882) George Routledge and Son. London.
 The Belfast Telegraph (3 July 1965), Belfast, County Antrim, Northern Ireland.

Defunct tennis tournaments in the United Kingdom
Grass court tennis tournaments